Família Vende Tudo is a 2011 Brazilian film directed by Alain Fresnot.

Plot 
A family with financial difficulties is a brilliant idea: to make the daughter Lindinha (Marisol Ribeiro) impregnate the famous singer Ivan Cláudio (Caco Ciocler), the king of Xique. They just did not have a jealous Jennifer (Luana Piovani), wife of Ivan, who will not let this story cheap.

Cast 
 Marisol Ribeiro ... Lindinha 
 Caco Ciocler ... Ivan Cláudio
 Luana Piovani ...	Jennifer
 Lima Duarte ... Ariclenes
 Imara Reis ... Eunice 
 Ailton Graça
 Vera Holtz
 Marisa Orth
 Robson Nunes
 Latino ... Choreographer

References

External links

2011 films
Brazilian comedy films
Films directed by Alain Fresnot
2010s Portuguese-language films
Films scored by Arrigo Barnabé